Désiré Van Den Audenaerde (3 September 1923 – 25 February 2011) was a Belgian footballer who played as a midfielder. He made five appearances for the Belgium national team from 1944 to 1948.

References

External links
 

1923 births
2011 deaths
Belgian footballers
Association football midfielders
Belgium international footballers
Royal Antwerp F.C. players
Place of birth missing